Azerbaijan competed at the 2002 Winter Olympics in Salt Lake City, United States.

Alpine skiing

Men

Figure skating

Men

Ice Dancing

Key: CD = Compulsory Dance, FD = Free Dance, FS = Free Skate, OD = Original Dance, SP = Short Program

References
 Official Olympic Reports
 Olympic Winter Games 2002, full results by sports-reference.com

Nations at the 2002 Winter Olympics
2002
2002 in Azerbaijani sport